Diane is a 1929 German silent film directed by Erich Waschneck and starring Olga Chekhova, Pierre Blanchar, and Henry Victor.

The film's sets were designed by the art director André Andrejew.

Cast

References

Bibliography

External links 
 

1929 films
Films of the Weimar Republic
German silent feature films
Films directed by Erich Waschneck
German black-and-white films
Bavaria Film films
1920s German films